Francis Scarlett may refer to:
 Francis Rowland Scarlett (1875–1934), British Air Vice Marshal
Francis Muir Scarlett (1891–1971), U.S. federal judge